David Needham (born 21 May 1949) is an English former professional footballer who played in the Football League for Notts County, Queens Park Rangers and Nottingham Forest, and in the North American Soccer League for the Toronto Blizzard, in the 1970s and 1980s.

Playing career

Notts County
Needham started his career at Notts County in 1966. He spent eleven years at the Magpies.

Queens Park Rangers

He was signed by Queens Park Rangers in the close season of 1977 for £90,000. He was signed to replace the recently retired Frank McLintock in the centre of QPR's defence. He only spent six months at the West London club.

Nottingham Forest
Newly promoted Nottingham Forest signed him in December 1977 for £140,000. At the end of the 1977–78 season he had picked up a winners medal as Forest won the First Division, but was ineligible for the League Cup which they won as he had played for QPR earlier in the competition. He did win a League Cup winners medal the following season when Forest retained the trophy, and was in the team which lost the 1980 final, when a mix-up between Needham and Peter Shilton led to the winning goal for Andy Gray. He was an unused substitute in both of Forest's European Cup final wins in 1979 and 1980.

Toronto Blizzard
He left Forest in 1982 to play in Canada. He signed for Toronto Blizzard in the North American Soccer League.

International
Needham was capped six times for England 'B', scoring twice.

References

1949 births
Living people
England B international footballers
English expatriate footballers
English expatriate sportspeople in Canada
English footballers
Expatriate soccer players in Canada
North American Soccer League (1968–1984) players
Nottingham Forest F.C. players
Notts County F.C. players
People educated at City of Leicester Boys' Grammar School
Footballers from Leicester
Queens Park Rangers F.C. players
Toronto Blizzard (1971–1984) players
Kettering Town F.C. players
Association football defenders
UEFA Champions League winning players